Kursi Aur Qanoon is a Pakistani Urdu language film directed by Masood Butt. Film music composer is M Ashraf and film song lyrics are by Saeed Gillani.

Synopsis
The story revolves around an Israeli agent Ameer Khan (Afzaal Ahmed) who, with his daughter Pinki (Reema), are here only to decapitate the country. In the quest of doing so they release Kali (Babar Ali) which causes a mystery to arise.

Cast
 Moammar Rana as Naveed Khan
 Shaan as Imran
 Babar Ali as Kali 
 Nargis
 Saima Noor as Laila
 Reema as Pinki
 Jan Rambo
 Shafqat Cheema
 Afzaal Ahmed

References

External links 
 

1999 films
1990s Urdu-language films
Pakistani action films
1999 action films
Urdu-language Pakistani films